Baron Blackford, of Compton Pauncefoot in the County of Somerset, was a title in the Peerage of the United Kingdom. It was created in 1935 for the politician, public servant and magistrate Sir William Mason, 1st Baronet. He had already been created a Baronet, of Compton Pauncefoot in the County Somerset, in the Baronetage of the United Kingdom in 1918. He was succeeded by his son, the second Baron. He was a businessman and Conservative politician. The titles became extinct in 1988 on the early death of his grandson, the fourth Baron.

Barons Blackford (1935)
William James Peake Mason, 1st Baron Blackford (1862–1947)
Glyn Keith Murray Mason, 2nd Baron Blackford (1887–1972)
Keith Alexander Henry Mason, 3rd Baron Blackford (1923–1977)
William Keith Mason, 4th Baron Blackford (1962–1988)

References

Extinct baronies in the Peerage of the United Kingdom
Noble titles created in 1935